National Tertiary Route 760, or just Route 760 (or ) is a National Road Route of Costa Rica, located in the Alajuela province.

Description
In Alajuela province the route covers Los Chiles canton (Los Chiles district).

References

Highways in Costa Rica